This was the second of four editions of the tournament in the 2021 ATP Challenger Tour calendar.

Mats Moraing and Oscar Otte were the defending champions but withdrew from the tournament before their first round match.

Nuno Borges and Francisco Cabral won the title after defeating Pavel Kotov and Tseng Chun-hsin 6–1, 6–2 in the final.

Seeds

Draw

References

External links
 Main draw

Open de Oeiras II - Doubles